Marcelo Gleiser (born March 19, 1959) is a Brazilian physicist and astronomer. He is currently Professor of Physics and Astronomy at Dartmouth College and was the 2019 recipient of the Templeton Prize.

Early life and education
Gleiser received his bachelor's degree in 1981 from the Pontifícia Universidade Católica do Rio de Janeiro, his M.Sc. degree in 1982 from the Universidade Federal do Rio de Janeiro, and his Ph.D. in 1986 from King's College London.  After this he worked as a postdoctoral researcher at Fermilab until 1988 and from then until 1991 at the Kavli Institute for Theoretical Physics.

Academic career
Since 1991, Gleiser has taught at Dartmouth College, where he was awarded the Appleton Professorship of Natural Philosophy in 1999, and is currently a professor of physics and astronomy.

His current research interests include the physics of the early Universe, the nature of physical complexity, and questions related to the origin of life on Earth and elsewhere in the Universe.  He has contributed seminal ideas in the interface between particle physics and cosmology, in particular on the dynamics of phase transitions and spontaneous symmetry breaking. He is the co-discoverer of "oscillons," time-dependent long-lived field configurations which are present in many physical systems from cosmology to vibrating grains. In 2012, he pioneered the use of concepts from information theory as a measure of complexity in nature. The author of over one hundred papers in peer-reviewed journals, Gleiser has also published six popular science books in the US: "Great Minds Don't Think Alike" (2022), "The Simple Beauty of the Unexpected" (2016),  "The Island of Knowledge" (2014),  A Tear at the Edge of Creation (2010), The Prophet and the Astronomer (2002), and The Dancing Universe (1997/2005). Translated into 17 languages, Gleiser's books offer a uniquely broad cultural view of science and its relation with religion and philosophy. "The Simple Beauty of the Unexpected", "The Prophet and the Astronomer" and "The Dancing Universe" won the Jabuti Award for best nonfiction in Brazil.

Apart from his contributions to magazines and newspapers in the US and abroad, Gleiser writes a weekly science column for the Brazilian Folha de S.Paulo newspaper. He is a Fellow of the American Physical Society, and currently serves as General Councilor. He has been awarded the Presidential Faculty Fellows Award from the White House and the National Science Foundation. He is also a member of the Brazilian Academy of Philosophy. In Brazil, he received the José Reis Award for the Public Understanding of Science from the Brazilian National Research Council and the Brazilian Diaspora Prize . He has been featured in several TV documentaries, including "Stephen Hawking's Universe," the History Channel's "Beyond the Big Bang" (2007) and "How Life Began" (2008), "Through the Wormhole with Morgan Freeman" (2014), Oprah Winfrey's "Belief", as well as many radio programs, including Fresh Air, Radiolab, On Being, and many others. In Brazil, his two science series for TV Globo's "Fantastico" were watched by over 30 million viewers. He is the co-founder of the science and culture blog, hosted by National Public Radio from 2011 to 2018, a science blog now hosted by BigThink under the new name 13.8: Science, Culture, and Meaning. In 2015 he founded the Institute for Cross-Disciplinary Engagement at Dartmouth, dedicated to foster a constructive dialogue between the sciences and the humanities. On 19 March 2019 he received the Templeton Prize for his works exploring the complex relationship between science, philosophy, and religion as complementary pathways for humankind's search for meaning.

Personal life 
He is married to psychotherapist Kari Gleiser. They live in Hanover, New Hampshire with their two sons: Lucian Jacob Gleiser, a varsity runner for the Hanover High School track and field and cross country teams, and younger brother, Gabriel Gleiser. He is also the father of Andrew Philip Gleiser, Eric Isaac Gleiser, and Tali Sarah Gleiser, from his former marriage to Wendy Lynn Gleiser.
Aside from his work in science and philosophy, Gleiser is a passionate endurance trail runner, frequently participating in ultramarathons in the US and Europe.

Bibliography (English)
 The Dancing Universe: From Creation Myths to the Big Bang, Plume (November 1, 1998), 
 The Prophet and the Astronomer: Apocalyptic Science and the End of the World, W. W. Norton & Company (July 21, 2003), 
 A Tear at the Edge of Creation: A Radical New Vision for Life in an Imperfect Universe, Free Press (April 6, 2010), 
 The Island of Knowledge: The Limits of Science and the Search for Meaning, Basic Books (June 3, 2014), 
 The Simple Beauty of the Unexpected: A Natural Philosopher's Quest for Trout and the Meaning of Everything, ForeEdge (June 7, 2016), 
Great Minds Don't Think Alike: Debates on Consciousness, Reality, Intelligence, Faith, Time, AI, Immortality, and the Human,  (February, 2022),

See also

References

External links

Dartmouth College Department of Physics and Astronomy biography and CV
Marcelo Gleiser's personal page
Institute for Cross-Disciplinary Engagement
Marcelo Gleiser's Question: Where Does Matter Come From?
Marcelo Gleiser extended film interview with transcripts  for the 'Why are We Here?' documentary series.

1959 births
20th-century astronomers
Alumni of King's College London
Brazilian astrophysicists
Brazilian astronomers
Brazilian columnists
Brazilian expatriate academics in the United States
Brazilian science writers
Brazilian Jews
Dartmouth College faculty
Federal University of Rio de Janeiro alumni
Jewish astronomers
Living people
Pontifical Catholic University of Rio de Janeiro alumni
Writers from Rio de Janeiro (city)
Critics of atheism
American physicists
American people of Brazilian descent
Fellows of the American Physical Society